Stockfleth (de Stockfleth/von Stockfleth) is a Dano-Norwegian noble family. Three branches of the family were naturalised as a part of the Danish nobility in 1779, based on a claim that the family had been noble since the time of King Valdemar III (1314–1364).

History 
The family descended from the merchant Eggert Stockfleth (dead 1638), originally from Haderslev, Denmark, who moved with his family to Bragernes, Norway in 1629. According to an old unconfirmed tradition he was supposed to descend from an old noble family. Two other branches of the family had been recognized as noble in the Danish order of precedence since the early 17th century. Eggert Stockfleth was the father of the prominent brothers Henning, Jacob and Hans Stockfleth.

Henning Stockfleth  (1610-1664) studied at University of Wittenberg for three years, before he was enrolled at the University of Copenhagen in 1635. He then held several official posts before he was appointed Bishop of Christiania in 1646. He was the father of civil servant and diplomat, Christian Stockfleth.

Jacob Stockfleth (1607-1652) became the Fogd (an old Norwegian title, kind of a combined sheriff and bailiff) of Gudbrandsdalen (from 1634) and then Fogd of Hadeland and Land  in Oppland (1642–46). He lived at the farm Isum in Sør-Fron for several years. He received  Hval in Ringerike as a gift from king Christian IV in 1646. Near the end of his life,  he became the Alderman (Rådmann)  of Christiania (now Oslo).

Hans Stockfleth (ca. 1600–1664)  was a businessman and land owner who served as the Mayor of Christiania from 1643 until his death.

Coat of Arms
The coat of arms shows an oval red shield with a six-pointed gold star in the upper right corner and a man with a helmet  in the lower left corner.

See also
Stockfleth (disambiguation)

References

Other sources
 A. Thiset og P.L. Wittrup: Nyt dansk Adelslexikon, Copenhagen 1904 
 Sven Tito Achen: Danske adelsvåbener, Copenhagen 1973

Danish noble families
Norwegian noble families